Herman L. "Reds" Bassman (February 25, 1913 – August 3, 2010) was an American football halfback who played one season with the Philadelphia Eagles of the National Football League. He played college football at Ursinus College and attended Central High School in Philadelphia, Pennsylvania.

College career
Bassman played for the Ursinus Bears from 1933 to 1935. He also participated in track and wrestling. He returned an interception 45 yards for a touchdown in a 7-6 upset victory against the Penn Quakers in 1934. Bassman was inducted into the Ursinus College Athletics Hall of Fame in 1980.

Professional career
Bassman played in eight games for the Philadelphia Eagles in 1936. Injuries reportedly cut short his career.

Personal life
Bassman served in the United States Army Air Corps during World War II. He died on August 3, 2010 in Petersburg, Virginia. He was the oldest living former Eagles player at the time of his death.

References

External links
Just Sports Stats

1913 births
2010 deaths
Central High School (Philadelphia) alumni
Players of American football from Philadelphia
American football halfbacks
Ursinus Bears football players
Philadelphia Eagles players
American male sport wrestlers
Ursinus Bears wrestlers
American male track and field athletes
Ursinus Bears men's track and field athletes
United States Army Air Forces personnel of World War II